is a Japanese anime television series. It is a spin-off of Disney's Lilo & Stitch franchise, serving as the franchise's second television series after Lilo & Stitch: The Series. The anime series aired in Japan from October 2008 to June 2011, later receiving additional television specials in 2012 and 2015. It features a Japanese girl named Yuna Kamihara, who takes the place of Lilo Pelekai as the best friend of the titular Stitch, and is set on a fictional island in the Ryukyus off the shore of Okinawa called Izayoi for its first two seasons, replacing Kauai, Hawaii, then moving to a fictional Okinawan city called New Town for its third season.

The first arc of the series, which serves as the first season outside Japan, was produced by Madhouse and aired from October 8, 2008, to March 25, 2009, with a post-season special on June 26, 2009, also known as "Stitch Day" in reference to Stitch's experiment number (626). A second arc of the original series, called  aired in Japan from October 13, 2009, to June 29, 2010, with another post-season special on August 8, 2010, completing Madhouse's 56-episode run. A 29-episode sequel series from the original two-arc anime, entitled , was produced by Shin-Ei Animation and aired on TV Asahi from July 6, 2010, to March 8, 2011, with a post-season special for this season on June 19, 2011. Shin-Ei then produced two more TV specials, known as Stitch! New Specials, that continued from the series. The first special, aired on June 16, 2012. The second post-series TV special, was announced on June 26, 2015, and aired on August 7, 2015. No further specials were produced after Perfect Memory, as Stitch! would be succeeded in the franchise by the Chinese animated series Stitch & Ai in 2017.

Production 
In March 2008, Walt Disney Television International Japan started procuring its own animated shows with their first two debuting at Tokyo International Anime Fair 2008, producing Stitch! with Japanese animation studio Madhouse. Seasons one and two of Stitch! were animated by Madhouse, and season three was animated by Shin-Ei Animation.

At the 2008 Tokyo International Anime Fair, the pilot for the series was showcased to attendees at the Madhouse booth. Information was also shown around Disney's booth, showing the cast of characters who would appear in the anime. Many of the past characters, such as Jumba Jookiba and Pleakley, appear, as well as five villains: Gantu, Dr. Jacques von Hämsterviel, Experiment 625/Reuben, Experiment 627 (in a second season episode), and (in the third season) a new villain named Delia. In addition, three of Jumba's genetic experiments, Experiment 624/Angel, Experiment 221/Sparky and Experiment 010/Felix, also appear in the anime's first season due to their popularity from the American series, although the latter two would appear less frequently in subsequent seasons while more experiments, both returning from the original series and its finale film, and new experiments made for this show, appear.

Stitch! started on TV Tokyo and following affiliates at 7:00 p.m. on October 8, 2008, and had an hour premiere of the first two episodes. Afterward, it aired every Wednesday after at 7:26 p.m. time slot, essentially replacing Bleach.

Where the Hawaiian culture was featured in the original version, the culture of Okinawa Prefecture and the other Ryukyu Islands are featured. For example, Yuna's karate has replaced Lilo's hula.

The Stitch! anime is influenced by children's manga and originally aimed at young Japanese kids aged 4 to 14 years. Most of the main characters are young children ranging from 8 to 12 years old, including Yuna. However, unlike the American series, the anime contains darker and more mature content.

The series was edited and localized for younger international audiences, especially those in the Western world and the Anglosphere, and a lower TV rating. The series's English dub used an American English-speaking cast that differed from the original cast of the previous films and Lilo & Stitch: The Series.

Characters

Main characters
 
 Also known as Experiment 626, he is an alien who one day ends up falling to an island located on Earth, called Izayoi Island, off the coast of Okinawa. In the Madhouse run, he discovers the "Spiritual Stone" on Izayoi, with the help of his new friend Yuna, and learns it can grant his wish of "ultimate power" (i.e. becoming the strongest in the universe), provided he does 43 good deeds. Thus, with his Good Deed Counter made by Jumba, he is able to keep track of his good deeds and keep track of his wish of becoming the strongest in the universe. However, he has mischievous tendencies that often make him lose deeds due to his overabundance of such things. He eventually gains the 43 good deeds at the end of Stitch! ~The Mischievous Alien's Great Adventure~, but decides that living with Yuna is better than having ultimate power and chooses to live with her forever instead. In Stitch! ~Best Friends Forever~, he, Yuna, Jumba, Pleakley, and Zuruko/Tigerlily all move to the city of Okinawa New Town, continuing to live his life with them.

 
 Yuna is a young Japanese girl; a tomboy at that, and is a 10-year-old 4th grade elementary school student (11-year-old 5th grade elementary school student in Stitch! ~Best Friends Forever~, albeit with her move to Okinawa New Town) who lives on a fictional island off the shore of Okinawa in the Ryukyus called Izayoi Island. Her personality is sweet and outgoing, while still tough and feisty all in all. Living on Izayoi Island, she learns and studies karate, having learned it from her grandpa. Her grandpa also did the honor of giving her a special type of star and, as a good luck charm in her study of karate before he left. Yuna lives a rather normal cherished life with her grandma. The other majority of her family are elsewhere, her father is out at work a lot as a marine biologist around Okinawa, and her mother died when she was an infant in a typhoon. Her life remained normal yet happy until one day, after a varied coincidence, she meets a strange creature that came crashlanding from the Turo system of outer space, Experiment 626, or as we know him, Stitch. From then and there when they met, the two became best friends and the duo go on various adventures on Stitch's quest in order to be "good". Yuna though has a strong sense of justice and an overbearing attitude, which make her a tomboy, and that shows throughout the series. The creators of the anime got Yuna's name from the Japanese name of sea hibiscus out in Okinawa (known in Japanese as Yuna). Yuna's birthday is 25 February. It can be assumed that Yuna's favorite animal is a porpoise or dolphin from a few instances in the series. Yuna isn't good at mathematics, often getting low scores on math tests. Yuna's last name, Kamihara, wasn't unveiled until much later, although previous guesses were Chitama, after the dojo and the forest on Izayoi and Hanako, which was Yuna's previous name and design during the development of the anime.

 
 Jumba is an "evil genius" scientist, the one who created Stitch and the other 625 experiments made before him. He is assigned by the Galactic Council to watch over Stitch and lives with Yuna and Gramma/Obaa. He is more friendly in this series than the original and has less of a penchant for evil.

 
 He is a one-eyed alien working for the Galactic Council and an Earth expert. He is Jumba's best friend and lives with him along with Yuna, Gramma/Obba, and Stitch.

 Gramma (Obaa)
 Yuna's paternal grandmother who Yuna lives with during the Madhouse seasons. She is the mother-in-law of Yuna's late mother. She is one of the three characters that believe in the existence of yōkai.

 Kijimunaa
 He is a little yokai who is Yuna and Stitch's friend. He is kind of a coward, but with the help of his friends, he can find the courage to best whatever he can.

Other characters
 
 Also known as Experiment 624, she is a pink female experiment who is Stitch's love interest. Stitch is madly in love with her and she shares the same feeling. Having become an intergalactic singing icon, Angel travels a lot, but she stops at the island, at times, to visit Stitch and Yuna. It turns out that while Stitch is immune to Angel's song if sung by her, it still will turn him evil if it's sung in a different voice.

 
 Also known as Experiment 221, he is a yellow male experiment with electrical abilities who is one of Stitch's cousins.

 
 Also known as Experiment 010, he is a green male experiment that cleans up anything, but when he runs out of things to clean, he sucks up things that are old.

 Penny (Piko)
 A blonde girl, rival to Yuna. Piko/Penny is self-centered, impatient, and in some cases, a bit snobby. She often takes great pride to mock and deride Yuna and Stitch in any case, often ending with Yuna and her fighting. There are rare occasions where she and Yuna can get along though. Her father runs the island's pineapple plants and her family runs the highest-rated hotels and resorts on Izayoi. There's a habit with Piko/Penny where when she's angered, she'll often end her ranting with a comparison of something akin to pineapples. She is also a black-team karate leader. Piko/Penny may have been idealized after the Hawaiian pop song "Pineapple Princess". Piko/Penny dislikes Sae but secretly does believe that she dresses better than her.

 Sasha (Sae)
 A young girl about Yuna's age who is introduced in The Mischievous Alien's Great Adventure. A transfer student from Kobe, she joins Yuna's class amidst the second season. She believes in good fashion and beauty, and is girly in spirit, often talking about fashion, love, and all. She's also quite ditzy at times. She believes Yuna has a good fashion sense and becomes good friends with her; as her fashion sense reminded her of her mother, a tropical fashion designer. Her father is a doctor. She not only has a rather brave personality, like Yuna; but she has a sweet and gentle personality too. Kouji/Kenny has a crush on Sae/Sasha, unbeknownst to her, and Piko/Penny secretly dislikes Sae/Sasha but believes that Sae/Sasha dresses better than she does.

 Tigerlily Sakai (Sasuga Zuruko)
Yuna's mean, bullying cousin who appears midway through The Mischievous Alien's Great Adventure. Although she may seem nice at first glance, being kind-hearted to others, she is harsh and cruel to Yuna for unknown reasons and constantly blackmails her into doing all the chores around the house (although she later claims that she's only trying to be a role model for Yuna). But when Yuna and Stitch move off to live with her in Best Friends Forever, she becomes more friendly with Yuna and treats her nicer, although she still forces her to do most of the house chores.

 Hiroman (Takumi)
 A boy from Okinawa New Town who was introduced in Best Friends Forever. A popular soccer player and the love interest of Reika/Jessica, he often acts cool and calm. He bears a secret of acting as a maid to his sisters and even dressing up in bishoujo-styled outfits for his sisters' enjoyment. His English name is obviously a play on "hero man". It is hinted that he and Yuna have feelings for each other since Yuna often saves him from trouble; in the episode "Dorkifier", it was shown that Yuna blushed at him.

 Jessica (Reika)
 Yuna's rival in season 3. She has a crush on Takumi and friends who she bosses around. She, like Piko/Penny from the first two seasons, likes to mock and deride Stitch and Yuna. She also bears a trait of saying rather dull jokes and puns, often met with a silent response. She is followed by two girls, Toriko and Makiko.

 Lilo Pelekai
 A character mentioned in the English dub who was Stitch's best friend in the past, but one day she left for college. However, her mention in the English dub is only due to Disney intertwining Stitch! with Leroy & Stitch (and the television series preceding it) for the English dub. The Japanese original bears little to no direct mention of Lilo, though they do mention a "bigger Hawaiian girl" in episode 2 similar to the main character in this series. However, episode 23 of Best Friends Forever had Lilo visit Okinawa in cahoots to reunite with Stitch, only for a while though. Lilo is now grown up and has a daughter who looks like her when she was younger, named Ani.

Villains
 Dr. Jacques von Hämsterviel
 A villain who was a college buddy of Jumba. Much like the rest of the franchise, he bears a want to defeat Stitch. Hämsterviel also wishes to steal Stitch's Good Deed Counter in order to gain ultimate power.

 Gantu
 He works under Dr. Hämsterviel, to steal Stitch's Good Deed Counter. According to the English dub, Gantu was dishonorably discharged from his Galactic Federation job due to bad karaoke singing. He bears an over-obsession to a television drama called "Red Rose Maiden", or "The Young and the Stupid" in the English dub. He has a huge crush on the main character of the drama, Princess Michigo.

 Reuben
 Also known as Experiment 625, he has all of the same powers as Stitch and works alongside Gantu, but he is lazy and eats sandwiches. Dr. Hämsterviel claims he doesn't do much besides make sandwiches all the time. During the series he isn't much of an enemy to Stitch, even coming to visit him sometimes. During "Reuben's Rice Balls", he becomes fond of rice balls, and even includes them among his sandwich ingredients.

 Delia
 An evil alien woman in a partnership with Dr. Jacques von Hämsterviel to get the Neo-PowerChip that is inside of Stitch. Delia altered a majority of the experiments, which had caused them to become physically stronger and evil, and Angel, who is rescued by Stitch. Delia usually calls Dr. Jacques von Hämsterviel the wrong name such as Hamu Sama or Hämusta Sama and then, when Hämsterviel's plans go wrong, she eventually punishes him based on whatever scheme he used.

 Dark End
 An experiment made by Delia who is designed to be much stronger than Stitch and his cousins. He is not among Stitch's cousins, as neither Jumba nor Hämsterviel made him.

 Cyber
 Also known as Experiment 000, he is an evil black-furred experiment who looks like a cyborg version of Stitch.

Episode list

Cast
With the exception of Rocky McMurray reprising his Lilo & Stitch: The Series and Leroy & Stitch role of Clyde in the English dub of the second season episode "Stitchman Meets Bonnie and Clyde", none of the original English voice cast from the Lilo & Stitch films or Lilo & Stitch: The Series reprised their roles for the English dub of this series.

Music

Soundtrack

 is a collection of opening, insert, and ending songs based on Stitch!. It was released on April 28, 2010.

Track list
  by Mongol800
 "Rodeo star mate" by The Pillows
 "SMILE" by Kimaguren
  by Begin
  by All Japan Goith
 "TOMODACHI" (Friends) by Glean Piece
 "HERO" by Kiyotaka Ishikawa
  by Bless4
 "Number One" by LoversSoul
  by Chihiro Kamiya
  by Bless4
  by LoversSoul
  by Begin featuring Kanako Hatoma

Theme songs

Stitch! (Season 1)
Opening theme
 by Begin
Ending themes
 by Begin w/ Kanako Hatoma (ep 1 - 13)
"Stitch is Coming" by Bless4 (ep 14 - 26)
Insert themes
 by Bless4

Stitch! ~The Mischievous Alien's Great Adventure~ (Season 2)
Opening theme
 "SMILE" by Kimaguren (ep 1 - 10)
 "Rodeo star mate" by The Pillows (ep 11 - 19)
  by Mongol800 (ep 20 - 29)
Ending theme
  by LoversSoul

Insert Song
 "Waning Moon" by Chihiro Kamiya
 "Number One" by LoversSoul
 "Tomodachi" by Gleam Piece
 "Aoi Arashi" by All Japan Goith
 "Hero" by Ishikawa Kiyotaka

Stitch! ~Best Friends Forever~ (Season 3)
Opening theme
  by Mariko Kojima featuring Chihiro Ozawa

 Ending theme
  by SYUHEI (Disney Channel Japan Only)

International version

The international version features an entirely different score composed by Thorsten Laewe, who released his score on his personal website.

Track list

Release

Broadcast
The series airs on Seven Network, 7mate, 7Two, and Disney Channel in Australia, on  Disney Channel in Singapore and India, on Toon Disney in Italy, on TV3 and TV2 in Malaysia, on TV5 in the Philippines, on RTÉ Two in Ireland, and on Disney Cinemagic in the United Kingdom.

The first season began airing in English on the Australian Disney Channel on 4 December 2009, and later on Disney Channel Asia 19 December 2009. The first season premièred on Disney Channel Latin America on 2 May 2010, in the American Spanish dub. The second season aired on Disney Channel Latin America on 6 June 2011. The third season aired on Disney Channel Latin America on 20 August 2012.

The first season also aired on Finland's Disney Channel beginning from 7 June 2010, subtitled in Finnish with the English dub. The anime has also aired in other Scandinavian countries on The Disney Channel, on Disney Cinemagic in the UK, and on Toon Disney in Italy. The Dutch version aired on Disney XD Netherlands and Disney Channel Netherlands as well as on the Disney Channel in Belgium. On October 24, 2011, the series began airing on Disney XD in the United States, but was removed from the schedule five days later for unknown reasons, leaving the series unfinished in the country. As a result, it has only five episodes aired in the U.S.

Home media
The series received several DVD box set releases in Japan.

Video on-demand
In Japan, the entire series and both post-series specials are available on Disney+. It was previously on Disney Deluxe, which was later rebranded as Disney+ in the country but run separately from the main platform. After the Japanese Disney+ merged with the main platform in October 2021, Stitch! was added to the main platform, albeit still restricted to Japan. Disney+ has only the original Japanese version of the series and splits Stitch and the Planet of Sand and Stitch! Perfect Memory into two parts each, each part its own episode; both specials are listed as part of season three. Despite the geo-blocking for non-Japanese subscribers, metadata for languages other than Japanese (such as English) exist on the service, including logos, with episodes titles using either their official dub titles or translations of their Japanese titles; episodes that were shortened and merged with other episodes in the international version also use their combined titles for their respective languages. In 2022, Disney+ added English-translated subtitles to all episodes, marking the first time that the series' original Japanese production was subbed, although it remains restricted to Japan on the service.

In India, Indonesia, Malaysia, and Thailand, the series's international version is available on Disney+ Hotstar, with the English dub available in all regions, and Hindi, Telugu, Tamil, Indonesian, and Thai dubs available depending on the region.

Notes

References

External links

Official Japanese sites 
 Disney's Stitch! website on Disney Channel Japan
 Disney's Stitch character page (Hawaii) 
 Disney's Stitch character page (Okinawa) 
 Official TV Asahi page of Stitch! ~Zutto Saikou no Tomodachi~ 
 Official TV Asahi page of Stitch! ~Itazura Alien no Daibouken~ 
 Official TV Tokyo page of Stitch!

International sites 
 Official Korean site (archive)
 Official Cantonese site (archive)

Others
 
 
 Stitch! on SaveLiloAndStitch.org

Lilo & Stitch (franchise)
2008 anime television series debuts
2009 Japanese television series endings
2009 anime television series debuts
2010 Japanese television series endings
2010 anime television series debuts
2011 Japanese television series endings
2000s science fiction television series
2010s science fiction television series
Animated television series about children
Animated television series about extraterrestrial life
Disney animated television series
Japanese children's animated comic science fiction television series
Madhouse (company)
Shin-Ei Animation
TV Tokyo original programming
TV Asahi original programming
Television shows set in Japan
Television series set on fictional islands
Animated television shows based on films
Television series based on Disney films
Television series by Disney
Sequel television series
Disney Channels Worldwide original programming
Extraterrestrials in anime and manga
Japanese television series based on American television series